Christopher Kelong (born 10 December 1976) is a Kenyan male long-distance runner. He twice represented his country at the IAAF World Cross Country Championships, placing tenth in the junior race in 1995 and sixth in the senior race in 1998. Such was Kenya's dominance at the latter event, he did not make the top four Kenyans to score points for the national team.

Outside of international competitions, he was third at the Great Edinburgh Run in 1995, won the 1996 Swansea Bay 10K. He won the Edinburgh race two years in a row in 1996 and 1997 and also took the Great South Run in the latter year. The 1998 season was his last on the roads, and he was winner of the Puy-en-Velay 15K that year.

International competitions

References

External links

Living people
1976 births
Kenyan male long-distance runners
Kenyan male cross country runners
20th-century Kenyan people
21st-century Kenyan people